Villar-Saint-Pancrace (also known as Grand Villar or le Villar) is a commune in the Hautes-Alpes department in southeastern France.

Population

See also
Communes of the Hautes-Alpes department

References

Communes of Hautes-Alpes